The Chimera House (also known as the "13 floor money back house") is an urban legend which consists of the usual young teens going out for a night on the town, only to stumble across a large, worn down multiple storey building where they are offered to go through a haunted attraction that consists of "real" horrors inside. In the story, the teens are asked to pay a certain amount of money (anywhere from 20-100 dollars) and told they will receive a portion back for every floor they complete. The twist is that no one has ever completed the house, and the ones who tried never came back out. Rumors state about the various horrors inside the house, from poisonous/deadly animals, to deformed humans, to the supernatural.  Accounts vary as to the exact number of floors in the house, but most accounts give the house 13 floors.

The legend is usually set in the south or midwest since there are a large amount of open and unknown areas in those parts. The editor of Haunted Attraction Magazine believes the urban legend originally started in Kansas City while others have suggested that the legend was also inspired by real haunted attractions like Britannia Manor and Raven's Grin Inn. Although the Chimera House has never been proven to exist, some people still search fervently for it and several haunted attractions are asked if they are the infamous 13 floor haunted house every October. 

The legend of the Chimera House has been fueled by both hoaxes and haunted attractions that tried to cash in on the legend by offering refunds if certain conditions are met. The anthology Haunted Houses edited by Robert D. San Souci contains a short story inspired by the legend called "Chimera House," in which several inner-city kids are led to the infamous haunted attraction.

References

External links
Urban Legends reference pages entry

Urban legends
Haunted attractions (simulated)